Jan Jozef Lambert van Hoof (7 August 1922 – 19 September 1944) was a member of the Dutch resistance in World War II, who cooperated with Allied Forces during Operation Market Garden. He is credited with disabling explosives placed by the Germans to destroy a vital bridge to delay allied liberation, and was later executed in action. Before and during the war, Van Hoof was a Rover Scout, and the Scouting medal the Nationale Padvindersraad was named in his honour.

Story of Jan van Hoof 

Before the war he was a Boy Scout with the Katholieke Verkenners (Catholic Scouts). During World War II Scouting was forbidden in most occupied countries. All the Scouting organizations were to be integrated into the Nationale Jeugdstorm (NJS), the Dutch version of the Hitler Youth. However, the Dutch Scouting organisations did not agree with the terms of the NJS and as a result went underground, with some joining the resistance.

Jan van Hoof joined the resistance. Shortly after the occupation of the Netherlands by the Nazis, he became a member of a Rover crew and in the spring of 1943 was secretly installed as full Rover Scout. During the occupation he made observations and drawings of key locations, especially the Waal Bridges. With the arrival of Allied troops during Operation Market Garden in September 1944 he used his local knowledge to guide the Allies during the Battle of Nijmegen.

It was said that he disarmed the explosives attached to the Waal Bridge during the fighting, though there were no witnesses. After this, he went home and told his sister 'the bridge is saved'; he then returned to the American unit and resumed guiding them through the city. Enquiries after the war could not positively identify Van Hoof as the individual who cut the wires to the bridge, however circumstantial evidence backs up the claim, and when the Germans eventually tried to blow the bridge, just before its capture, their attempts failed.

The Dutch resistance members wore distinguishing armbands so they could be recognised as soldiers. The Germans however saw this as a provocation and did not recognize them as combatants.

On 19 September, van Hoof was riding on the top of a British Guards Armoured Division Humber Scout Car, guiding the vehicle from the central post office to Allied soldiers attacking the railway bridge, when a German 2-cm gun opened fire, setting the vehicle alight. When the German troops arrived, the British crew were already dead, but van Hoof was still alive. They took his gun, identity papers and his armband which identified him as an official allied soldier. He was beaten and then shot through the head.

Decorations 

Van Hoof was posthumously awarded:
 1945: Medal of Freedom with bronze Palm (USA),
 1946: Order of William Knight 4th Class (Netherlands),
 1947: The King's Commendation for Brave Conduct with silver laurel (UK),

After the war the Honor Medal for bravery of the Nationale Padvindersraad, the Dutch Boy Scouts umbrella organisation before 1973, was renamed to Jan van Hoof-kruis in his remembrance.

Monuments dedicated to Jan van Hoof 

These monuments and graves are dedicated to Jan van Hoof.
 Nijmegen, 
 Nijmegen, 'honour grave' of Jan van Hoof
 Nijmegen, monument on the Waal Bridge
 Nijmegen, monument at the Joris Ivensplein
 Nijmegen, Dutch War Cemetery

See also 
5th World Scout Jamboree
Scouting memorials

References

External links
 Left Handshake by Hilary Saint George Saunders, about Scouting during World War II
 Jan van Hoof Article about Jan van Hoof, by Piet J. Kroonenberg (Dutch)
 Biography of Jan van Hoof Website: Oorlogsdodennijmegen.nl

1922 births
1944 deaths
Dutch resistance members
People from Nijmegen
Resistance members killed by Nazi Germany
Scouting and Guiding in the Netherlands
Dutch people executed by Nazi Germany
Executed Dutch people
People executed by Nazi Germany by firearm
Knights Fourth Class of the Military Order of William
Recipients of the Medal of Freedom
Recipients of the Queen's Commendation for Brave Conduct
Dutch civilians killed in World War II